Epic is the third studio album by American electronic music duo Blood on the Dance Floor, released on October 5, 2010. The album is the group's first with Jayy Von Monroe and their first to appear on the US Billboard charts. Several of the tracks appeared on previous Blood on the Dance Floor releases and reappear here in a rerecorded format. In 2020, the 17th track of this album titled "You Done Goofed" was brought up as evidence relating to the Jessi Slaughter cyberbullying case.

Music videos
The first video was shot for the single "Death to Your Heart!". It was published on YouTube in December 2010. It centers on Blood on the Dance Floor members Dahvie Vanity and Jayy Von Monroe taking part in a joke fight with two girls. The first two rounds the girls are winning but in the final round Vanity and Von Monroe scare them and the girls and other fans begin to bleed.

Track listing

Personnel
Blood on the Dance Floor
 Dahvie Vanity – vocals, keyboards
 Jayy Von Monroe – clean and unclean vocals
Additional musicians
 Rusty Wilmot – drums, electronic beats, guitars, synths

Charts

References

2010 albums
Blood on the Dance Floor (duo) albums